Ross Sutherland may refer to:

 Ross Sutherland (footballer) (1937–1989), Australian rules footballer 
 Ross Sutherland (politician), New Democratic Party political candidate in the 2004 Canadian General Election
 Ross Sutherland RFC, Scottish rugby union club

Sutherland, Ross